The large fig parrot (Psittaculirostris desmarestii), also known as flame-headed fig parrot and Desmarest's fig parrot, is a species of parrot in the family Psittaculidae.
It is found in the West Papuan Islands, Indonesia and in southern and western New Guinea (Indonesia and Papua New Guinea).

Description 
It has a red to orange cap, a light blue eye patch below its eye, yellow face, pale turquoise ring tinged with red, grey-black bill and green body. Male and female adults are identical in external appearance and juveniles tend to have duller colours on the head, but otherwise resemble adults.

Habitat 
Its natural habitats are subtropical or tropical moist lowland forest, subtropical or tropical mangrove forest, and subtropical or tropical moist montane forest.

Subspecies 
It has these subspecies:
 P. desmarestii 
 P. d. blythii
 P. d. cervicalis
 P. d. desmarestii
 P. d. godmani
 P. d. intermedia
 P. d. occidentalis

References

World Parrot Trust Parrot Encyclopedia - Species Profile

Cited texts
 

large fig parrot
Birds of Western New Guinea
large fig parrot
Taxonomy articles created by Polbot